Malwarebytes, Inc. v. Enigma Software Group USA, LLC was a 2020 United States federal court case concerning the legal immunity given to internet companies under section 230 of the Communications Decency Act.  It was denied certiorari to the U.S. Court of Appeals for the Ninth Circuit, but Justice Clarence Thomas of the Supreme Court of the United States made a statement respecting the denial of certiorari.  He opined that section 230 had been interpreted too broadly, and could be narrowed or eliminated in a future case, which he urged his colleagues to hear. Justice Thomas cited  Judge Robert Katzman's dissent from the majority ruling in Force v. Facebook Inc.

References 

United States Internet case law